Chapel of the Chimes was founded as California Electric Crematory in 1909 as a crematory and columbarium at 4499 Piedmont Avenue, at the entrance of Mountain View cemetery in Oakland, California. The present building dates largely from a 1928 redevelopment based on the designs of the architect Julia Morgan. The Spanish Gothic architecture features Moorish motifs and the interior is a maze of small rooms featuring ornate stonework, statues, gardens, fountains and mosaics.

History

The chapel originates with a crematory built in 1909 by the California Crematorium Association on the site of a trolley car station; the old structure still has train schedules on the wall. Architect Julia Morgan was hired to expand the facility; the new crematory and columbarium were dedicated on Memorial Day 1928, named Chapel of the Chimes for the chimes in the tower. Architect Aaron Green, a protégé of Frank Lloyd Wright, subsequently contributed six additions over 24 years, including mausoleums.

The building maintains its original functions, and also serves as the venue for annual music festivals on the winter and summer solstices.

The chapel's owners operate funeral homes and cemeteries, not designed by Morgan, in Hayward, also under the name Chapel of the Chimes, as well as Sunset Lawn Chapel of the Chimes in Sacramento.

Chapel of the Chimes holds the records of the Chapel of Memories on Pleasant Valley Avenue.

Garden of Memory

Garden of Memory has been held 1996–present; this is a columbarium walk-through event held every year on the evening of the summer solstice. It features over 40 musicians performing on unique instruments, or compositions designed for the event. The sound is often electronic or electro-acoustic in source and then electronically processed.

Notable interments
Notable burials include the following:
 Harriet Chalmers Adams (1875–1937), explorer
 Malcolm Playfair Anderson (1879–1919), explorer and zoologist
 Dick Bartell (1907–1995), baseball player
 Russ Christopher (1917–1954), baseball player
 Frederick George Coppins (1889–1963), Canadian recipient of the Victoria Cross in World War I
 Al Davis (1929–2011), National Football League executive and Oakland Raiders owner
 John A. Elston (1874–1921), US Congressman
 Wesley Englehorn (1890–1993), college football player and coach
 William Frederick "Bones" Ely (1863–1952), baseball player
 John Lee Hooker (1917–2001), musician
 Charles Goodall Lee (1881–1973), First Chinese American Dentist
 Stephen Stucker (1947–1986), Actor, comedian
 Friend Richardson (1865–1943), California governor
 Henry Vollmer (1867–1930), mayor of Davenport, Iowa, US Congressman
 Herbert Archer (H.A.) Richardson, timber and shipping magnate
 Grace Richardson Butterfield, California State Parks Board, Grand Matron of the Eastern Star

See also 

 List of cemeteries in California
 List of electronic music festivals

References

External links
 Garden of Memory
 Chapel of the Chimes (Oakland, California)
 
 
 

Chapels in California
Columbaria
Julia Morgan buildings
Churches in Oakland, California
Music venues in the San Francisco Bay Area
Cemeteries in Alameda County, California
1909 establishments in California